Gilyov-Log is a rural locality (a selo) and the administrative center of Gilyov-Logovskoy Selsoviet, Romanovsky District, Altai Krai, Russia. The population was 846 as of 2013. There are 6 streets.

Geography 
Gilyov-Log is located on the Baklanka River, 20 km north of Romanovo (the district's administrative centre) by road. Zhuravli is the nearest rural locality.

References 

Rural localities in Romanovsky District, Altai Krai